Pico Pijol National Park is a national park in Honduras. It was established on 1 January 1987 and covers an area of 122.1 square kilometres. It has an altitude of between 1,800 and 2,282 metres.

References

National parks of Honduras
Protected areas established in 1987
Central American dry forests
Central American Atlantic moist forests